Club La Unión (also known as La Unión de Formosa) is a sports club based on the city of Formosa, Argentina. The club is known for both its basketball and volleyball teams.

Basketball

Current roster

External links
 
 La Unión on LNB

Unión
Unión
Formosa, Argentina